MoMu (Mode Museum) is the fashion museum of the City of Antwerp, Belgium. Founded on 21 September 2002, the museum collects, conserves, studies and exhibits Belgian fashion. The museum is specifically focusing on Belgian contemporary fashion designers due to the arising of a group of Antwerp-trained fashion designers during the Eighties and Nineties (Martin Margiela, Dries Van Noten, Ann Demeulemeester, Walter Van Beirendonck, Dirk Van Saene, A.F. Vandevorst, etc.). The museum's first director was Linda Loppa who was also the founder and the director of the Fashion school of the Royal Academy of Fine Arts (Antwerp). The current director is Kaat Debo.

The museum is known for its immersive scenography.  Visitors are "immersed in the world of the designer or the theme", allowing for a unique experience with every exhibition.

Exhibitions
MoMu organises continually changing theme exhibitions about a designer or fashion-related theme in an exhibition space specifically adapted to each exhibition. Each exhibition is created around a total narrative in which not only articles of clothing are displayed, but a complete context is presented. For example, sources of inspiration for a designer, connections with other art disciplines, multimedia collaborations, etc. MoMu works with designers and their team to develop the exhibition concept and the design of the exhibition. Since 4 September 2021 MoMu also continually shows a part of its own permanent collection after adding an exhibition space through an extensive three year renovation. MoMu's exhibitions have also travelled to Paris, Stockholm, London, Tokyo, Munich, Istanbul, Enschede and Melbourne. Below an overview of past, present and future exhibitions.

 Backstage: Selectie I / Backstage: Selection I - 21/09/2002 - 04/04/2003
 Patronen / Patterns - 24/04/2003 - 10/08/2003
 GenovanversaeviceversA - 09/09/2003 - 28/03/2004
 Goddess - 08/05/2004 - 22/08/2004
 Malign Muses - 18/09/2004 - 30/01/2005
 Beyond Desire - 25/02/2005 - 18/08/2005
 Katharina Prospekt: The Russians by A.F. Vandevorst - 09/09/2005 - 05/02/2006
 Yohji Yamamoto Dream Shop - 07/03/2006 - 13/08/2006
 De MoMu-Collectie: Selectie II / The MoMu Collection: Selection II - 08/09/2006 - 17/06/2007
 6+ Antwerpse Mode / 6+ Antwerp Fashion - 25/01/2007 - 23/06/2007
 Bernhard Willhelm: Het Totaal Rappel - 13/07/2007 - 10/02/2008
 Moi, VERONIQUE BRANQUINHO TOuTe Nue - 12/03/2008 - 17/08/2008
 Maison Martin Margiela '20' The Exhibition - 12/09/2008 - 08/02/2009
 Paper Fashion! - 06/03/2009 - 16/08/2009
 Delvaux - 180 Jaar Belgische Luxe / 180 Years of Belgian Luxury - 17/09/2009 - 21/02/2010
 ZWART. Meesterlijk Zwart in Mode & Kostuum / BLACK. Masters of Black in Fashion & Costume - 17/09/2009 - 21/02/2010
 Stephen Jones & Het Accent op Mode / Stephen Jones & The Accent of Fashion - 08/09/2010 - 13/02/2011
 ONTRAFEL Tricot in de Mode / UNRAVEL - Knitwear in Fashion - 16/03/2011 - 14/08/2011
 WALTER VAN BEIRENDONCK. Dream The World Awake - 14/09/2011 - 19/02/2012
 EEN LEVEN IN DE MODE. Vrouwenkleding 1750–1950. Uit de Collectie Jacoba de Jonge. / LIVING FASHION. Women's Daily Wear 1750–1950. From the Jacoba de Jonge Collection. - 21/03/2012 - 12/08/2012
 Madame Grès. Sculptural Fashion / Madame Grès. Sculpturale Mode. - 12/09/2012 - 10/02/2013
 Zijde & Prints uit het Abrahamarchief - Couture in Kleur / Silks & Prints from the Abraham Archive - Couture in Colour - 13/03/2013 - 11/08/2013
 Happy Birthday Dear Academie - 08/09/2013 - 13/02/2014
 Birds of Paradise. Pluimen & Veren in de Mode / Birds of Paradise. Plumes & Feathers in Fashion - 20/03/2014 - 24/08/2014
 MoMu Nu. Hedendaagse Mode uit de MoMu Collectie / MoMu Now. Contemporary Fashion from the MoMu Collection - 25/09/2014 - 04/01/2015
 Dries Van Noten. Inspirations - 12/02/2015 - 19/07/2015
 Footprint. Het Spoor van Schoenen in de Mode / Footprint. The Tracks of Shoes in Fashion - 03/09/2015 - 14/02/2016
 Game Changers. Het 20e-Eeuwse Silhouet Heruitgevonden / Game Changers. Reinventing the 20th Century Silhouette - 18/03/2016 - 14/08/2016
 Rik Wouters & Het Huiselijk Utopia / Rik Wouter & The Private Utopia - 17/09/2016 - 26/02/2017
 Margiela, De Hermès Jaren / Margiela, The Hermès Years - 31/03/2017 - 27/08/2017
 Olivier Theyskens - She Walks in Beauty - 12/10/2017 - 15/04/2018
 Soft? Tactiele Dialogen / Soft? Tactile Dialogues - 28/09/2018 - 24/02/2019
 E/MOTION. Mode in transitie / E/MOTION. Fashion in Transition - 04/09/2021 - 23/01/2022
 P.LACE.S - De verborgen kant van Antwerpen / P.LACE.S - Looking through Antwerp Lace - 25/09/2021 - 09/01/2022

Projects 
 Visuele Thesaurus voor Mode & Kostuums. Een Linked Open Data-project - 1/11/2015 - 31/08/2017
 MoMu Study Collection - MoMu has a study collection of roughly 1,000 objects. This collection consists of clothing and –fragments, as well as textile objects from the 18th century to the present.
 Google Arts & Culture - We Wear Culture. Discover fashion history through six online exhibitions curated by MoMu on the Google Arts & Culture platform.

Sources

Museums in Antwerp
Fashion museums
Textile museums
Belgian fashion
2002 establishments in Belgium
Museums established in 2002